Cap 1 may refer to:
 CAP1, Adenylyl cyclase-associated protein 1, an enzyme that in humans is encoded by the CAP1 gene
CAP-1 Planalto, an aircraft
Capital One Financial Corporation
Captain America: The First Avenger, a 2011 film